Vysoká is a village and municipality in Banská Štiavnica District, in the Banská Bystrica Region of Slovakia.

Villages and municipalities in Banská Štiavnica District